Chris or Christopher Boyd may refer to:
Chris Boyd (rugby union) (born 1958), New Zealand rugby coach
Christopher Boyd (IT security), computer security expert
Christopher Boyd (politician) (1916–2004), British politician

See also
Kris Boyd (born 1983), Scottish footballer
Kris Boyd (American football) (born 1996), American football player